Hannah Kelly may refer to:
 Hannah Kelly (politician)
 Hannah Kelly (dancer)
 Hannah Kelly (athlete)